Venansius Baryamureeba (born 18 May 1969) is a Ugandan mathematician, computer scientist, academic, and academic administrator. He was the Acting vice chancellor of the Uganda Technology and Management University, a private university in Uganda, from September 2013 until 28 September 2015. He left the position to join the presidential race in Uganda to take place in 2016. Before that, he served as the vice chancellor of Makerere University from November 2009 until August 2012.

Background and education
He was born in Kasharara Village, Kagongo Parish, Ibanda District, in the Western Region of Uganda. He holds a Bachelor of Science in mathematics, obtained in 1994 from Makerere University. He also holds a Master of Science and a Doctor of Philosophy, both in computer science and both from Bergen University in Norway, awarded in 1996 and in 2000, respectively. In 1997, he was awarded the postgraduate Diploma in the Analysis of Linear Programming Models by the University of Trondheim, also in Norway.

Career
His career in academia began soon after his first degree, when he worked as a teaching assistant in the Institute of Statistics and Applied Economics at Makerere University, from 1994 until 1998. He then worked as an assistant lecturer at the Institute of Teacher Education Kyambogo, which now is part of Kyambogo University, from 1995 until 1996. While pursuing graduate study in Norway, he worked as a teaching assistant in the Department of Informatics at Bergen University from 1997 until 2000. He also worked as a research fellow, in the same department and institution, from 1995 until 2000.

Beginning in 1998 until 2000, he worked as a lecturer in the Department of Mathematics at Makerere University. He was a senior lecturer in the Institute of Computer Science at Makerere University, from 2001 until 2006 (which was transformed into the Department of Computer Science, Faculty of Computing and IT (FCI)). He then became an associate professor, and, in November 2006, he was made a professor, continuing to teach until August 2012 at FCI. From October 2005 until June 2010, he served as the dean of FCI.

From November 2009 until August 2012, he was vice chancellor of Makerere University.

At Uganda Technology and Management University, he has served since September 2012 as the vice chancellor and as a professor of computer science in the School of Computing and Engineering.

Works 

 The enhanced digital investigation process model
 Extraction of interesting association rules using genetic algorithms
 Cyber crime in Uganda: Myth or reality?
 The role of ICTs and their sustainability in developing countries
 Mining High Quality Association Rules Using Genetic Algorithms.
 Optimized association rule mining with genetic algorithms
 ICT as an engine for Uganda's economic growth: The role of and opportunities for Makerere University
 ICT-enabled services: a critical analysis of the opportunities and challenges in Uganda
 Towards domain independent named entity recognition
 
 
 
 
 
 Computational issues for a new class of preconditioners
 
 The role of TVET in building regional economies
 Computer forensics for cyberspace crimes
 On the properties of preconditioners for robust linear regression
 On a class of preconditioners for interior point methods
 
 Logit analysis of socioeconomic factors influencing famine in Uganda.
 Solution of robust linear regression problems by preconditioned conjugate gradient type methods
 
 
 A new function for robust linear regression: An iterative approach
 Approaches towards effective knowledge management for small and medium enterprises in developing countries-Uganda
 
 
 
 
 
 
 
 The role of academia in fostering private sector competitiveness in ICT development

See also
 Education in Uganda
 Ugandan university leaders
 List of universities in Uganda

References

External links
Website of Uganda Technology and Management University
Baryamureeba Speaks Out On Life After Makerere - 15 October 2012
Professor Venansius Baryamureeba – Five Plus Interview: 24 August 2013
Baryamureeba Denies Defaming Makerere Don - 16 February 2013

1969 births
Living people
Academic staff of Makerere University
Academic staff of Kyambogo University
Vice-chancellors of universities in Uganda
Ibanda District
Ugandan mathematicians
People from Ibanda District
Makerere University alumni
University of Bergen alumni
Norwegian University of Science and Technology alumni
Academic staff of Uganda Technology and Management University
Ugandan expatriates in Norway
People educated at St. Leo's College, Kyegobe